The Natal Government Railways Class K 0-6-0ST of 1880 was a South African steam locomotive from the pre-Union era in the Colony of Natal.

In 1880, the Natal Government Railways placed a single  saddle-tank locomotive in service. It was virtually identical to the Harbour Board of Natal's locomotive John Milne of 1879 and was built by the same manufacturer. During 1905 or 1906, the locomotive was designated .

Manufacturer
In 1880, the Natal Government Railways (NGR) placed an order for a single  saddle-tank locomotive with Hunslet Engine Company in Leeds. It was virtually identical to the engine John Milne which had been supplied to the Harbour Board of Natal from the same manufacturer in 1879, having been built to the same design, but with some differences in detail such as those visible on the sides of their respective smokeboxes. The locomotive was numbered 15 in the NGR number range, following on from the numbers allocated to the NGR's first batch of Kitson-built Class G  locomotives of 1879.

Service
The NGR's no. 15 was still in service by 1909. During 1905 or 1906, a locomotive classification system was introduced on the NGR and no. 15 became part of Class K, which consisted of a potpourri of different tank locomotive types with different wheel arrangements. The Class included the 0-4-0ST locomotives of 1891 and the surviving three of the  locomotives of 1877.

Disposition
It is not known whether the locomotive had been scrapped or sold by 1912. It was no longer in service when the South African Railways (SAR) renumbering and classification was implemented in 1912, since it does not appear in the classification and renumbering lists issued by the SAR Chief Mechanical Engineer in January 1912.

References

0740
0740
0-6-0 locomotives
C locomotives
Hunslet locomotives
Cape gauge railway locomotives
Railway locomotives introduced in 1880
1880 in South Africa
Scrapped locomotives